Schwäbisch Hall is a Landkreis (district) in the northeast of Baden-Württemberg, Germany. Neighboring districts are (from north clockwise) Main-Tauber, the Bavarian district Ansbach, Ostalbkreis, Rems-Murr, and Hohenlohe.

History
The district dates back to the Oberamt Schwäbisch Hall, which was created in 1803, when the previously free imperial city Schwäbisch Hall became part of Württemberg. After several minor changes, it was converted into a district in 1938. In 1973, it was merged with the district Crailsheim and the area around Gaildorf, which was part of the also dissolved district Backnang.

Geography
The two rivers Jagst and Kocher, tributaries to the Neckar, flow through the district. The landscapes covered by the district are the Hohenlohe plain (Hohenloher Ebene), the Swabian-Franconian Forest (Schwäbisch-Fränkischen Waldberge), which includes part of the Mainhardt Forest, and the Frankenhöhe.

Partnerships
The district maintains partnerships with the district Delitzsch (now part of Nordsachsen) in Saxony and the Polish commune of Zamość.

Coat of arms
The coat of arms shows a coin in the top part. The city of Schwäbisch Hall was one of the most important minting towns, the local coin Heller was well known in all of Germany. Below the coin are two hooks, taken from the coat of arms of the district Crailsheim, as well as from the city of Gaildorf. The black-and-white checkered area in the bottom is taken from the coat of arms of the Hohenzollern dynasty, who ruled the area historically.

Cities and municipalities

References

External links

 Official website (German)

 
Stuttgart (region)
Districts of Baden-Württemberg
Württemberg